Iotated E or Iotated Ukrainian Ye ( ) is a letter of the Cyrillic script. It is only used in Church Slavonic language.

History

Usage
Iotated E is found in some of the very oldest examples of Cyrillic writing, such as the tenth-century Mostich inscription or the Codex Suprasliensis, whereas in others, such as the Enina Apostle or Undol'skij Fragments, it is not present at all.

Among the Eastern Slavs  fell into disuse after the end of the fourteenth century, and it is not therefore represented in printed books from this area, or in modern Church Slavonic. It continued to be used in both manuscript and printed material throughout the sixteenth and seventeenth centuries, but it no longer appears in the alphabet in M. Karaman's abecedarium of 1753. In certain orthographical variants of Bulgarian, it can be found at least up to the middle of the 19th century.

Computing codes

References

Cyrillic ligatures